ABS-2A is an all-electric propulsion commercial communications satellite which is owned and operated by ABS. Co-located with ABS-2 at the 75°E orbital position, the satellite provides coverage over markets in South East Asia, Africa, MENA and Russia. The satellite is equipped with 48 Ku-band transponder and is designed for DTH services, cellular backhaul, VSAT, maritime and mobility solutions.

Manufacture and specifications 
The satellite was designed and manufactured by Boeing, and is a Boeing 702SP model communication satellite. It was launched on board a SpaceX Falcon 9 rocket on 15 June 2016.  The satellite lifted off as part of a dual launch and was the second deployment at 11:05am EDT.  

The satellite is propelled solely by electrically powered spacecraft xenon propulsion, with the on-board thrusters used for both geostationary orbit insertion and station keeping.

The satellite utilizes five Ku-band beams and covers South East Asia, Africa, MENA and Russia.

Launch 
The launch occurred on 15 June 2016 at 11.05am EDT and the satellite was deployed in the planned supersynchronous transfer orbit at 11:40am EDT.

On-orbit operations 
The satellite became fully operational as a geosynchronous communications satellite on 21 January 2017 after orbit raising and in-orbit tests by Boeing and a handover from Boeing to ABS for on-orbit operations.

References 

SpaceX commercial payloads
Spacecraft launched in 2016